The 1250s decade ran from January 1, 1250, to December 31, 1259.

Significant people
 Möngke Khan
 Hulagu Khan
 Al-Mustasim
 Aybak
 Al-Ashraf Musa
 Louis IX of France

References